The Electoral district of Rainbow was an electoral district of the Victorian Legislative Assembly.

Members

Dodgshun earlier represented the electoral district of Ouyen 1938–1945.

Election results

See also
 Parliaments of the Australian states and territories
 List of members of the Victorian Legislative Assembly

References

Former electoral districts of Victoria (Australia)
1945 establishments in Australia
1955 disestablishments in Australia